Toft may refer to:

People
 Albert Toft (1862–1949), English sculptor
 Alfonso Toft (1866–1964), English pottery artist
 Christian Toft (born 1968), Danish Olympic swimmer
 Claude Toft (1922–1981), Irish politician and Mayor of Galway
  (born 1947), Mayor of Gentofte Municipality
 Harry Toft (1881–1951), Welsh rugby player
 Henrik Toft (born  1981), Danish footballer
 Henry Toft (1909–1987), English rugby union international
 Karl Toft (1936–2018), Canadian sex offender
 Malcolm Toft, English audio engineer
 Mary Toft (1701–1763), English woman involved in a medical hoax
 Mathilde Rivas Toft (born 1997), Norwegian handballer
 Monica Toft, American international relations scholar
 Omar Toft (1886–1921), American racecar driver
 Rolf Toft (born 1992), Danish footballer
 Sandra Toft (born 1989), Danish handball player
 Thomas Toft (died 1698), English potter

Places
 , a village in Nordland, Norway
Toft, Shetland, Scotland

England 
 Toft, Cambridgeshire
 Toft, Cheshire
 Toft, Lincolnshire
 Toft, Warwickshire
 Toft Hill, County Durham
 Toft Monks, Norfolk
 Toft Newton, Lincolnshire

Other uses
 Theatre on Film and Tape Archives (TOFT) of the New York Public Library for the Performing Arts
 Toft Cricket Club, an amateur cricket club in Cheshire, England
 Toft Hall, a 17th-century country house in Toft, Cheshire, England
 Toft Monks Priory, a priory in Norfolk, England
 Toft village, a settlement comprising small, closely packed farms (tofts)

See also
 Toft Hill (disambiguation)
 Tofte (disambiguation)
 Burgage, a medieval land term used in England and Wales, Ireland and Scotland
 Tuft (disambiguation)
 Tufte, surname
 Tufts (disambiguation)

Danish-language surnames